Apolipoprotein C-IV, also known as apolipoprotein C4, is a protein that in humans is encoded by the APOC4 gene.

Function 

APOC4 is a member of the apolipoprotein C gene family. It is expressed in the liver and has a predicted protein structure characteristic of the other genes in this family. APOC4 is a 3.3-kb gene consisting of 3 exons and 2 introns; it is located 0.5 kb 5' to the APOC2 gene.

References

External links

Further reading

Apolipoproteins